Fleurantia is a genus of prehistoric lungfish which lived during the Devonian period. Fossils have been found in North America.

References 

Prehistoric lungfish genera
Devonian bony fish
Extinct animals of North America